Casson Trenor is an American environmentalist, author, entrepreneur, and media personality. He is the author of a number of books on environmentalism and sustainable seafood, in particular Umijoo, a children's book, and Sustainable Sushi, a reference guide. Trenor and two co-founders created the world's first sustainable sushi restaurant in 2009, as well as the acclaimed plant-based Japanese restaurant Shizen in 2015. In recognition of his work, Trenor was awarded a Congressional Commendation as well as the title "Hero of the Environment" by Time magazine.

Trenor currently works primarily as a speaker, author, and consultant on environmental and sustainability issues. Over the course of his career, he has worked for and with a number of environmental causes, such as Greenpeace, FishWise, the Monterey Bay Aquarium, and the Conservation Strategy Fund. In April 2012, Trenor featured as part of a TEDx event in San Francisco, California. The talk focused on the sustainable sushi movement, which he was partly responsible for starting. His work for Greenpeace heightened his profile within the sustainable seafood movement when he produced Greenpeace's first Carting Away the Oceans report. Despite him moving on from Greenpeace in 2014, they still produce the report annually.

Early life and education
Aaron Casson Trenor was born on April 7, 1979, in Seattle, Washington. Soon after, he and his family moved to Mukilteo, Washington, where he attended public school and lived until the age of 17. In 2000, Trenor received a B.A. in political science from Hobart and William Smith Colleges, and is a member of Phi Beta Kappa. He then pursued an interest in cuisine and in 2001 received a chef certificate in classical French cuisine from the Pacific Institute of Culinary Arts. In 2005, Trenor received an M.A. in international environmental policy from Middlebury Institute of International Studies at Monterey, California. In May 2012, Trenor received the Alumni Achievement Award from Middlebury Institute of International Studies.

Career
After graduation in 2005, Trenor obtained the position as director for the Invasive Species Program with the Conservation Strategy Fund. He worked with Sea Shepherd on their Operation: Leviathan in Antarctica between 2006 and 2006. The operation received coverage in Peter Heller's book The Whale Warriors. In 2007, he moved to FishWise to become director of Business Development. In 2008, Trenor with Kin Lui and Raymond Ho founded Tataki Sushi Bar in San Francisco, California. The idea came after he had spent a number of months at sea trying to save the life of whales in Antarctica. He realized very quickly that one of the biggest issues with overfishing was the sushi industry. During his TEDx presentation, he stated that he wanted to try and save the world's oceans by producing sustainable sushi after he spoke to a couple of sushi chefs. According to Trenor during his presentation, Tataki Sushi Bar in San Francisco, California became the world's first sustainable sushi restaurant.

In 2009, Trenor went to work at Greenpeace as senior markets campaigner. Since then he has held various positions at Greenpeace, all aimed at improving the oceans and the fishing industry. As a senior Greenpeace campaigner, he has been responsible for heading up numerous campaigns that have led to major changes in the way seafood is caught and sold in the United States. These campaigns have been both confrontational and cooperative, improving the seafood operations of major US companies such as Costco, Trader Joe's, Walmart, and Safeway. He was the primary architect in producing Greenpeace's annual Carting Away the Oceans reports. Trenor and James Mitchell authored Carting Away the Oceans 7 in 2009. The studies and reports have continued to be produced by Greenpeace, which is still being used today to change the way the United States retail industry deals with seafood.

While still working with Greenpeace, Trenor's work with Tataki Sushi Bar didn't go unnoticed. His work in the field of sustainable sushi led Trenor to become a major media contributor and speaker on the subject from 2008 onwards. In 2009, Time magazine recognized him as a "Hero of the Environment" and a year later was also received Congressional Commendation and the "Ocean Protection Hero" award. In 2011, he was featured in Forbes where he said "the sushi industry is like a snake with its tail in its mouth", when describing the issues the food industry faced. Trenor presented at the TEDx conference in San Francisco in April 2012. He spoke about his personal experiences of growing up in Washington and going to a beach where he would collect clams for his mother to cook. As he grew older the beach became more polluted through logging and other forms of industrialization of the region. Much of the unspoiled wildlife he grew up with had become spoilt. He said this was one of the main reasons for him starting the sustainable sushi restaurant back in 2008.

In December 2014, he left Greenpeace to focus on restaurant development and to pioneer a new plant-based approach to sushi. He and Kin Lui opened Shizen Vegan Sushi Bar and Izakaya in San Francisco in January 2015. In 2016, Trenor and Lui launched Limu & Shoyu in San Francisco that featured a sustainable interpretation of Hawaiian poke. In 2019, Trenor and Lui opened Tane Vegan Sushi Bar in Honolulu, and in 2020, Trenor and business partner John Le opened Chikyū Vegan Sushi Bar & Izakaya in Las Vegas.

In 2016, Trenor partnered with pop surrealist painter and environmental activist Caia Koopman to create Umijoo, a children's book about ocean conservation and responsible food systems. The vast majority of Umijoo is hand-painted, which is a highly uncommon technique within children's literature. Written as an extended poem in three parts, Umijoo spans 72 pages and features two dozen original paintings, as well as a series of pencil drawings. It took Koopman three years to paint the book, which was released in March 2019. In 2020, Umijoo won the Nautilus Book Awards gold medal for middle-grade fiction.

Achievements and accolades
Trenor was named one of Time magazine's Heroes of the Environment in 2009. He is the author of two books: Umijoo and Sustainable Sushi.  He was honored with a Nautilus Book Awards gold medal for Umijoo.

He is a founder and co-owner of Shizen Vegan Sushi Bar in San Francisco and Chikyū Vegan Sushi Bar in La Vegas.

In 2010, Trenor received the Ocean Protection Hero award from the Save Our Shores marine conservation NGO. He received the award: "in recognition for the sustainable seafood advocacy work he has done in the Santa Cruz area, including helping the Monterey Bay Aquarium create the well-known sustainable seafood and sushi cards."

In 2019, Trenor was honored by the California State Senate for his "visionary leadership and service to the preservation of the oceans".

Publications
Trenor, Casson, & Koopman, Caia. (2019). Umijoo. Shark & Siren Press. 72 pages. , 978-1-7328605-0-6.
Trenor, C., & Mitchell, J. (2013). Carting Away the Oceans 7. Greenpeace: Amsterdam, The Netherlands, 149.
Trenor, Casson. (2009). Sustainable Sushi: A Guide to Saving the Oceans One Bite at a Time. North Atlantic Books. 110 pages. , 978-1-55643-769-4.

See also
 Miya's

References

External links
 
 Casson Trenor at TEDx San Francisco

Living people
1979 births
Activists from California
American chefs
American environmentalists
American male chefs
American restaurateurs
Hobart and William Smith Colleges alumni
Middlebury College alumni
People from Mukilteo, Washington
People from San Francisco